The UK Rock & Metal Albums Chart is a record chart which ranks the best-selling rock and heavy metal albums in the United Kingdom. Compiled and published by the Official Charts Company, the data is based on each album's weekly physical sales, digital downloads and streams. In 2002, there were 14 albums that topped the 52 published charts. The first number-one album of the year was Linkin Park's debut studio album Hybrid Theory, which remained at number one for the first two weeks of the year at the end of a six-week run which began on 8 December 2001. The final number-one album of the year was By the Way, the eighth studio album by Red Hot Chili Peppers, which spent the last six weeks of the year (and the first three weeks of 2003) at number one in its fourth spell of the year at the top of the chart.

The most successful album on the UK Rock & Metal Albums Chart in 2002 was By the Way, which spent a total of 19 weeks at number one over four spells, including an initial run of seven consecutive weeks and a run at the end of the year of nine weeks (including the first three of 2003). By the Way was the best-selling rock and metal album of the year, ranking sixth in the UK End of Year Albums Chart. Nickelback's major label debut Silver Side Up spent 16 weeks at number one in 2002, and was the 12th best-selling album of the year in the UK. Queen's three-disc compilation box set The Platinum Collection spent three weeks at number one in 2002, while three more albums – Linkin Park's Hybrid Theory, P.O.D.'s Satellite and the self-titled compilation by Nirvana – were number one for two weeks each during the year.

Chart history

See also
2002 in British music
List of UK Rock & Metal Singles Chart number ones of 2002

References

External links
Official UK Rock & Metal Albums Chart Top 40 at the Official Charts Company
The Official UK Top 40 Rock Albums at BBC Radio 1

2002 in British music
United Kingdom Rock and Metal Albums
2002